Edmar Gomes Rodrigues (born 27 March 1981 in João Pinheiro), commonly known as Edmar or Edmar Dida is a retired Brazilian professional footballer who played as a goalkeeper.

Career 
Edmar began his career at the youth ranks of Atlético Mineiro. He was nicknamed Dida due to his looks, similar to fellow goalkeeper Dida. He was promoted to the senior squad on 1999, and had a brief loan spell at Democrata before returning to Atlético.

On 21 January 2002, Edmar got arrested for cocaine possession. He served as an understudy to Velloso for three seasons before getting his maiden appearance for Galo on 11 August 2002, starting in a 2–1 home loss to Corinthians. He played in four more matches for the club before being replaced during the 25 August match against Palmeiras, leaving the game at half time due to injury.

After being relegated to third-string behind Velloso and Eduardo, Edmar had short spells at Tupi, Estoril and Corinthians Alagoano, before leaving for Bahia in December 2005.

On 2007, Edmar joined Gama. He moved to Democrata de Sete Lagoas for the 2008 Campeonato Mineiro. The following year, he joined América Mineiro as second-fiddle to Flávio.

He went on to play for Anapolina and Iranian club Damash Guilan before moving to Poços de Caldas on 2012.

International career 
Edmar was part of the Brazil under-20s team that won the 2001 Hong Kong tournament.

Honours

International 

 Hong Kong International Tournament: 2001

References 

1981 births
Living people
Brazilian footballers
Association football goalkeepers
Campeonato Brasileiro Série A players
Esporte Clube Bahia players
Sociedade Esportiva do Gama players
Clube Atlético Mineiro players
América Futebol Clube (MG) players
Esporte Clube Democrata players
Democrata Futebol Clube players
Associação Atlética Anapolina players